Yoshie Takada (born 1966) is a Japanese table tennis player. Her highest career ITTF ranking was 21.

She won a bronze medal in the women's team event at the 2001 World Table Tennis Championships.

References

1966 births
Living people
Japanese female table tennis players